Deudorix smilis is a butterfly in the family Lycaenidae. It was described by William Chapman Hewitson in 1863. It is found in the Indomalayan realm.

The larvae feed on Strychnos lucida.

Subspecies
Deudorix smilis smilis (Assam, Burma, Peninsular Malaysia, possibly Thailand, Andamans, possibly Sumatra)
Deudorix smilis silo Fruhstorfer, 1912 (Borneo)
Deudorix smilis vocetius Fruhstorfer, 1912 (Palawan)
Deudorix smilis nicevillei (Tytler, 1926) (Andaman Island)
Deudorix smilis sylvia (D'Abrera, 1971) (Obi, Bachan)
Deudorix smilis dalyensis (Le Souff & Tindale, 1970) (Australia: Daly River Crossing)

References

External links
Deudorix at Markku Savela's Lepidoptera and Some Other Life Forms

Deudorix
Butterflies described in 1863
Butterflies of Indonesia
Butterflies of Oceania
Taxa named by William Chapman Hewitson